Acrobasis centunculella is a species of snout moth in the genus Acrobasis. It was described by Josef Johann Mann in 1859. It is found in southern Europe.

References

Moths described in 1859
Acrobasis
Moths of Europe